Anton Bruckner composed about 20 lieder during his life, the earliest in , the last in 1882. Most of the lieder were composed during his stay in the St. Florian Abbey (1845–1855) and his tuition by Otto Kitzler (1861–1862).

St. Florian and early Linz period 
During his stay in St. Florian and in Linz before Kitzler's tuition, Bruckner made sketches for two lieder and composed three lieder.

During the beginning of his stay in St. Florian, Bruckner made sketches for two lieder:
The manuscript, in which the piano accompaniment is incomplete, is stored in the archive of the St. Florian Abbey. This , of which a facsimile was first published in Band II/2, pp. 59–60, of the Göllerich/Auer biography, is edited in Band XXIII/1,  Liedentwürfe, of the Bruckner's .
The first part (bars 1-56) of the manuscript with incomplete piano accompaniment is stored in the archive of the St. Florian Abbey, the remaining with bars 57-60 is found in the city museum of Wels. This , of which a facsimile of the first part was first published in Band II/2, pp. 65–66, of the Göllerich/Auer biography, is edited in Band XXIII/1,  Liedentwürfe, of the Bruckner's .

Thereafter, Bruckner composed three lieder:
The lied is part of the workbook "", which has been retrieved in the Landesmuseum of Upper Austria. The workbook has been issued in 2015 by the Anton Bruckner Institut Linz.
 Frühlingslied (Spring song), WAB 68, a 24-bar lied in A major, composed in 1851 for the name-day of Aloisia Bogner on a text by Heinrich Heine. The lied is edited in Band XXIII/1, No. 1, of the Bruckner's .
 Wie bist du, Frühling, gut und treu (Springtime, how good and faithful you are), WAB 58, a 102-bar lied in G major composed in 1856 on five strophes of Oskar von Redwitz' Amaranths Waldeslieder. The lied is edited in Band XXIII/1, No. 2, of the Bruckner's .

During Kitzler's tuition 
The lieder and sketches, which Bruckner composed in 1861–1862 as exercises during Kitzler's tuition, are found in the Kitzler-Studienbuch:
 O habt die Thräne gern (1st setting), WAB 205, a 16-bar lied in A minor: Kitzler-Studienbuch, pp. 18–19 
 Nachglück (1st setting), WAB 204, a 16-bar lied in C major: Kitzler-Studienbuch, p. 19
 Herzeleid, WAB 232, a 16-bar sketch for a lied in E minor: Kitzler-Studienbuch, p. 20
 Nachglück (2nd setting), WAB 235, a 16-bar sketch for a lied in F major: Kitzler-Studienbuch, p. 21
 Von der schlummernden Mutter, WAB 206, a 20-bar lied in F major: Kitzler-Studienbuch, p. 22
 Des Baches Frühlingsfeier, WAB 202, a 22-bar lied in D minor: Kitzler-Studienbuch, p. 23
 Wie neid ich Dich, du stolzer Wald, WAB 207, a 24-bar lied in E-flat major: Kitzler-Studienbuch, p. 24
 O habt die Thräne gern (2nd setting), WAB 236, a 32-bar sketch for a lied in A minor: Kitzler-Studienbuch, p. 42
 Last des Herzens, WAB 234, a 32-bar sketch for a lied in E-flat major: Kitzler-Studienbuch, p. 43
 Es regnet, WAB 231, a 24-bar sketch for a lied in E minor: Kitzler-Studienbuch, pp. 46–47
 Wunsch, WAB 238, a 32-bar sketch for a lied: Kitzler-Studienbuch, pp. 47–48
 Der Trompeter an der Katzbach, WAB 201, a 90-bar lied in F minor on a text by Julius Mosen: Kitzler-Studienbuch, pp. 207–213

After Kitzler's tuition 
After the end of  Kitzler's tuition, during his later stay in Linz and in Vienna, Bruckner composed  four other lieder:
 Herbstkummer (Autumnal sorrow), WAB 72, a 62-bar lied in E minor composed in April 1864 on a text by "Ernst".
 Mein Herz und deine Stimme (My heart and your voice), WAB 79, a 60-bar lied in A major composed in 1868 on a text by August von Platen.
 Volkslied (National hymn), WAB 94, a 34-bar composition in C major composed in 1882 on a text by Josef Winter. Bruckner composed it, as well as a second setting for men's choir (Sämtliche Werke, Band XXIII/2, No. 32), for a competition  (for a singable National hymn).
These lieder are edited in Band XXIII/1, Nos. 3 to 6, of the :

Discography 
Five commercial recordings contain Bruckner's lieder:
 Marie Luise Bart-Larsson (soprano), Gernot Martzy (piano), Kammermusikalische Kostbarkeiten von Anton Bruckner – CD Weinberg Records SW 01 036–2, 1996: Herbstkummer and Mein Herz und deine Stimme
 Robert Holzer (bass), Thomas Kerbl (piano), Anton Bruckner - Lieder/Magnificat – CD LIVA 046, 2011: the lieder issued in Band XXIII/1 of the Gesamtausgabe, except the Volkslied. Reissued as Anton Bruckner - Lieder, Chöre, Magnificat – CD Gramola 99071, 2015, with, in addition, the in the meantime retrieved Der Mondabend. NB: The lieder are transposed to match Holzer's tessitura.
 Ulf Bästlein (baritone), Sascha El Mouissi (piano), Ich blick’ in mein Herz und ich blick' in die Welt - CD Gramola 99136, 2017: Im April
 Elisabeth Wimmer (soprano), Daniel Linton-France (piano): 
 Böck liest Bruckner I (3 October 2018) – CD Gramola 99195, 2019: Frühlingslied, Amaranths Waldeslieder and Mein Herz und deine Stimme. NB: In addition, Bruckner's Der Mondabend is compared with Schubert's Der Mondabend, D.141.
 Böck liest Bruckner II (5 October 2019) – CD Gramola 99237, 2020: Herbstkummer, Im April, and two lieder from the Kitzler Study Book: O habt die Thräne gern, WAB 205 and Vor der schlummernden Mutter, WAB 206

References

Sources 
 August Göllerich, Anton Bruckner. Ein Lebens- und Schaffens-Bild,  – posthumous edited by Max Auer by G. Bosse, Regensburg, 1932
 Anton Bruckner – Sämtliche Werke, Band XXIII/1: Lieder für Gesang und Klavier (1851–1882), Musikwissenschaftlicher Verlag der Internationalen Bruckner-Gesellschaft, Angela Pachovsky (Editor), Vienna, 1997
 Anton Bruckner - Sämtliche Werke, Band XXV: Das Kitzler Studienbuch (1861-1863), facsimile, Musikwissenschaftlicher Verlag der Internationalen Bruckner-Gesellschaft, Paul Hawkshaw and Erich Wolfgang Partsch (Editors), Vienna, 2015
 Lieder für Luise Bogner, eine Volksliedersammlung Anton Bruckners, Oberösterreichische Schriften zur Volksmusik, Band 16, Klaus Petermayr (Ed.), Anton Bruckner Institut Linz, 2015
 Cornelis van Zwol, Anton Bruckner 1824–1896 – Leven en werken, uitg. Thoth, Bussum, Netherlands, 2012. 
 Uwe Harten, Anton Bruckner. Ein Handbuch. , Salzburg, 1996. .
 Crawford Howie, Anton Bruckner - A documentary biography, online revised edition

External links 
 Weltliche Vocalwerke Critical discography by Hans Roelofs 
 Four of the lieder performed by Robert Holzer can also be heard on YouTube: Frühlingslied, Wie bist du, Frühling, gut und treu,  Mein Herz und deine Stimme and Im April